Yeah is an album by Swedish band The Wannadies, released in 1999 in Scandinavia and spring 2000 in the UK.

Track listing

References

External links
Official Wannadies website

The Wannadies albums
1999 albums
Albums produced by Mike Hedges
Albums produced by Ric Ocasek